Peter Guthrie may refer to:
 Peter Guthrie (footballer)
 Peter Guthrie (politician)